Rob MacKillop (born 1959) is a Scottish composer and multi-instrumentalist, specializing in lute, theorbo, vihuela, banjo, ukulele and both classical and Russian guitar. He is an important performer of Early Music in Scotland. He is also a photographer.

Biography
Rob MacKillop was born in Dundee, Scotland.  After a youthful period of playing the ukulele, MacKillop started teaching himself guitar as a teenager, playing along to records of Muddy Waters and Johnny Winter. When 17 years old, he was asked by his brother-in-law, Angus McFarlane, to play slide guitar on what was claimed to be Scotland’s first punk single, though it was more in the style of pub rock with a Stones/New York Dolls influence. The single was re-released in 2017.

In 2001, he was awarded a Churchill Fellowship for his research into medieval Scottish music. In 2004, he was named Composer in Residence for Morgan Academy in Dundee, and in 2001 was Musician in Residence for Madras College, St Andrews. He also organized and directed the Dundee Summer Music Festival. He was formerly Musician In Residence at Queen Margaret University, Musselburgh near Edinburgh.

MacKillop recorded several compositions by Roman Turovsky on vihuela, lute and theorbo. Turovsky's Cantio Sarmatica CXI was dedicated to MacKillop.

Discography
He has recorded seven CDs of music for various early plucked instruments, three of which reached the Number One position in the Scottish Classical Music Chart.
 Love Is The Cause - Scottish Tunes for Viola da gamba and baroque Guitar, Jonathan Dunford, gamba, and Rob MacKillop, baroque guitar. Arrangements from Scottish manuscripts. Alpha 530. 2009.
 Fernando Sor -  the Art of the 19th-century Guitar, Volume 1 - Selected Studies. RMmusic 2012.
 The Early American Parlour Banjo - Rob MacKillop, gut-strung banjo.
 Recital: The Art of the Banjo 1910 - 1930. RMmusic, 2012.
 James Oswald - Twelve Divertimentis for the Guittar (1759) - ASV Gaudeamus CD GAU 221
 Premier recording of the complete divertimenti for the guitar by James Oswald, performed on an original wire-strung guitar from c.1765.
 The Healing - Scottish lute, cittern and guitar music. Greentrax Recordings, 2002. CDTRAX227.
 Flowers of the Forest - Scottish lute, cittern and guitar music. Greentrax Recordings, 1998. CDTRAX155.
 Plucked Instruments in the Edinburgh University Collection of Historical Musical Instruments, played by Rob MacKillop. Baroque guitar, French, mid-18th century; 9 course lute, labelled Matteus Buchenberg; 19th-century guitar by Louis Panormo, 19th-centru guitar by C. F. Martin. 1999. EUCHMICD101.
 Graysteil - Music from the Middle Ages and Renaissance In Scotland - Rob MacKillop, lute, William Taylor harp and clarsach, Paul Rendal (tenor voice) Andrew Hunter ( traditional music singer). Dorian Records, 1997. Dorian Discoveries DIS 80141.
 Notes of Note, Notes of Joy - The Rowallan Consort, Temple Records, 1995. Scottish music of the 16th and 17th centuries. Lute (Rob MacKillop), clarsach, (William Taylor), voice, (Paul Rendall and Mhaiari Lawson). Temple Records COMD 2058.
 The Songs of Alexander Montgomerie, Poet to James VI of Scotland. Paul Rendall, tenor, Rob MacKillop lute and mandour. ASV Gaudeamus CD GAU249

Family
MacKillop's wife Susan Rennie is a writer who translated the Adventures of Tintin into Scots.

Bibliography
MacKillop is an author of many didactic music scores published by Mel Bay.

 24 Pieces for Guitar by Gilbert Isbin - edited and recorded by Rob MacKillop. Mel Bay Publications MB30660M
 Classical and Contemporary Studies for Bass Guitar - arranged and edited by Rob MacKillop Mel Bay Publications MB30676M
 Tunes from 17th-century Scotland for mandolin - arranged and recorded by Rob MacKillop. Mel Bay Publications MB30679M
 Easy Classical Mandolin Tunes for Kids - arranged and recorded by Rob MacKillop. Mel Bay Publications MB30680M
 Easy Popular Mandolin Tunes for Kids - arranged and recorded by Rob MacKillop. Mel Bay Publications MB30681M
 DADGAD Easy Christmas Favourites - arranged and recorded by Rob MacKillop. Mel Bay Publications MB30644M
 DADGAD Ragtime and Early Jazz - arranged and recorded by Rob MacKillop. Mel Bay Publications MB30568M
 DADGAD Old-Time, Flatpicking and Bluegrass - arranged and recorded by Rob MacKillop. Mel Bay Publications MB30567M
 Introduction to the Lute - for lute and guitar players - arranged and recorded by Rob MacKillop. Mel Bay Publications MB30589M
 20 Progressive Fingerstyle Studies for Uke - arranged and recorded by Rob MacKillop. Mel Bay Publications MB22126M
 Easy DADGAD Classics for Acoustic Guitar - arranged and recorded by Rob MacKillop. Mel Bay Publications MB30545M
 DADGAD Blues - arranged and recorded by Rob MacKillop. Mel Bay Publications MB30544M
 20 Pieces from Briggs’ Banjo Instructor arranged for Ukulele - arranged and recorded by Rob MacKillop. Mel Bay Publications MB22127M
 Early Irish-American Banjo - arranged and recorded by Rob MacKillop. Mel Bay Publications MB22173M
 Bach’s Cello Suites I-III arranged for Tenor Banjo - arranged and recorded by Rob MacKillop. Mel Bay Publications MB30430M
 Early American Classics for Banjo - arranged and recorded by Rob MacKillop. Mel Bay Publications MB22172M
 The Bach Uke Book - duets for two ukuleles, one in gCEA tuning, the other a baritone in DGBE tuning - arranged and recorded by Rob MacKillop, ukulele, and Gordon Ferries (guitar). Mel Bay Publications MB30024M
 Easy DADGAD Celtic Guitar - arranged and recorded by Rob MacKillop. Mel Bay Publications MB30543M
 20 Old-Time American Tunes arranged for Ukulele - arranged and recorded by Rob MacKillop. Mel Bay Publications MB30037M
 20 Easy Classical Uke Pieces for Kids - arranged and recorded by Rob MacKillop. Mel Bay Publications MB30429M
 20 Spanish Baroque Pieces by Gaspar Sanz arranged for Ukulele - arranged and recorded by Rob MacKillop. Mel Bay Publications MB22128M
 20 Popular Uke Tunes for Kids - arranged and recorded by Rob MacKillop. Mel Bay Publications MB30431M
 20 Easy Fingerstyle Studies - arranged and recorded by Rob MacKillop. Mel Bay Publications MB30025M
 20 Celtic Fingerstyle Uke Tunes - arranged and recorded by Rob MacKillop. Mel Bay Publications MB22129M
 The Scottish Guitar - arranged and recorded by Rob MacKillop. Centerstream Publications 
 Scottish Traditional Music For Guitar in DADGAD and Open G Tunings, by Rob MacKillop. The Hardie Press. 
 Sonatas of the Scottish Enlightenment - arranged for fingerstyle/classical guitar, by Rob MacKillop. Mel Bay 2001

References

External links
 
 Rob MacKillop - YouTube - YouTube channel
 Rob MacKillop - New Songs, Playlists & Latest News - BBC Music - on BBC
 
 
 
 
 

1959 births
Living people
Composers for lute
Historicist composers
Scottish classical guitarists
Scottish lutenists
Musicians from Dundee